Charles Herman Helmsing (March 23, 1908 – December 20, 1993) was an American prelate of the Roman Catholic Church who served as bishop of the Diocese of Kansas City–St. Joseph in Missouri (1962–1977).

Biography

Early life 
Helmsing was born on March 23, 1908, to George and Louisa Helmsing. He entered St. Louis Preparatory Seminary and then went on to Kenrick-Glennon Seminary before being ordained a priest for the Archdiocese of St. Louis on June 10, 1933. He became a papal chamberlain (monsignor) on February 15, 1946.

Auxiliary Bishop of Saint Louis 
Pope Pius XII appointed Helmsing as an auxiliary bishop of the Archdiocese of Saint Louis and titular bishop of Axomis on March 17, 1949.  On April 19, 1949, Helmsing was consecrated by Cardinal Joseph Ritter. 

He took a marked interest in the propagation of the faith, the instruction of converts, the work of the Legion of Mary, as well as both foreign and home missions. He worked as secretary and master of ceremonies for Cardinal Ritter and took on a number of other positions, including director of the Diocesan Society for the Propagation of the Faith.

Bishop of Springfield-Cape Girardeau 
On August 24,1956, when Pius XII divided Missouri into four dioceses, he appointed Helmsing as the first bishop of the Diocese of Springfield–Cape Girardeau. He was installed as bishop there on November 28, 1956.

Bishop of Kansas City-Saint Joseph 
Pope John XXIII appointed Helmsing as bishop of the Diocese of Kansas City – St. Joseph on January 31, 1962. In his installation homily on April 3, 1962, Helmsing explained his motto:

"In the sacrifice of the Cross, Christ our Lord identified Himself with the Old Testament servant of Yahweh, the slave of Almighty God, foretold by the prophets. It was this realization that impelled me to take as the motto of my life and work as a Bishop, the inspired words of the 115th Psalm, Servus tuus, filius anciliae (“O Lord, I am Thy slave and the son of Thy handmaid”).

It is in this spirit that I come to you with humble determination aided by our Lord’s grace to imitate Him as the slave of the Lord Who became obedient unto death, even the death of the Cross; and also in imitation of His Mother, Mary, who when the greatest possible task was given to her of mothering the Son of God, referred to herself “Behold the slave-girl of the Lord”.Helmsing attended the Second Vatican Council in Rome with future Cardinal) William Wakefield Baum as a peritus (expert). During the initial debate on the schema for liturgy (De Sacra Liturgia), a note is made of Helmsing's intervention on point no. 39 on the importance of the homily in the liturgy.  Mathijis Lamberigts notes that Helmsing argued that the homily ought to be systematic and theologically well founded. 

Helmsing took part in all four sessions of the Second Vatican Council and was most influential in the composition of the Decree on Ecumenism (Unitatis Redintegratio). Helmsing returned to Kansas City, where he supported civil rights and brought home the documents of the Second Vatican Council and was responsible for implementing them in the diocese.

In November 1963, Helmsing was elected to the Vatican Secretariat for Christian Unity, which worked under Cardinal Bea to collect statements to the secretariat concerning the schema. The result was 1,063 pages published in six volumes. This helped to prepare revisions to the schema which were returned to council fathers.

In 1968 the National Catholic Reporter (NCR) was officially condemned by Helmsing for "their policy of crusading against the Church's teachings". When the paper was founded, Bishop provided diocesan office space and funds until the paper was able to move to the building where it continues to this day. In the late 1960s, Helmsing objected most specifically to the paper's strong stands on artificial birth control, priestly celibacy and criticism of the hierarchy, citing an imbalance in news coverage. Sixty-six Catholic journalists signed a petition supporting NCR.

Retirement and legacy 
On June 27, 1977, Pope Paul VI accepted Helmsing's resignation as bishop. Charles Helmsing died in Kansas City, Missouri, on December 20, 1993, aged 85.

In the fall of 2006, Bishop Robert W. Finn  named a new adult faith formation initiative in the Diocese of Kansas City-Saint Joseph after Helmsing. The Bishop Helmsing Institute offers a three-year faith formation program for lay people and has four full-time instructors.

References

External links
Bishop Helmsing Institute
Decree on Ecumenism(Unitatis Redintegratio)

 

1908 births
1993 deaths
People from St. Louis County, Missouri
20th-century Roman Catholic bishops in the United States
Kenrick–Glennon Seminary alumni
Roman Catholic Archdiocese of St. Louis
Roman Catholic bishops of Springfield–Cape Girardeau
Roman Catholic bishops of Kansas City–Saint Joseph
People from Kansas City, Missouri
Participants in the Second Vatican Council
Place of death missing